In probability theory and statistics, the log-Laplace distribution is the probability distribution of a random variable whose logarithm has a Laplace distribution. If X has a Laplace distribution with parameters μ and b, then Y = eX has a log-Laplace distribution.  The distributional properties can be derived from the Laplace distribution.

Characterization

A random variable has a log-Laplace(μ, b) distribution if its probability density function is:

The cumulative distribution function for Y when y > 0, is

Generalization 
Versions of the log-Laplace distribution based on an asymmetric Laplace distribution also exist. Depending on the parameters, including asymmetry, the log-Laplace may or may not have a finite mean and a finite variance.

References

External links 

Continuous distributions
Probability distributions with non-finite variance
Non-Newtonian calculus